The 2012–13 ECHL season was the 25th season of the ECHL.  The regular season schedule ran from October 12, 2012 to March 30, 2013, with the Kelly Cup playoffs to follow. The All-Star Game, not held in 2011-12, was brought back and held on January 23, 2013 at Budweiser Events Center in Loveland, Colorado, home of the Colorado Eagles.

League business

Team changes 
On September 21, 2011, the ECHL Board of Governors approved the membership of the San Francisco Bulls for the 2012–13 season. The Bulls will play in the Cow Palace, which was the home of the San Jose Sharks of the NHL for their first two seasons.

On November 1, 2011, the ECHL Board of Governors approved the membership of the reincarnation of the Orlando Solar Bears for the 2012–13 season. The Solar Bears will play in the Amway Center which is currently home to the NBA's Orlando Magic.

The league announced on April 6, 2012, that the expansion franchise Chicago Express had withdrawn from the ECHL, effective immediately. The Express finished their inaugural season ninth in the Eastern Conference with a record of 34 wins, 26 losses, 8 overtime losses, and 4 losses in shootouts, eliminating them from playoff contention. The team also finished last in the league for attendance, averaging 2,508 fans per game (compared to the league average of 4,282 fans per game).

On May 17, 2012, the ECHL announced the addition of two expansion franchises - the Evansville IceMen and the Fort Wayne Komets, both located in Indiana and both former Central Hockey League markets. The IceMen will play home games at the Ford Center and the Komets at the Allen County War Memorial Coliseum. The league also indicated that 23 teams would play in the 2012–13 season, making these two franchises the last to be added.

Annual Board of Governors meeting
The league's annual Board of Governors meeting concluded on June 25, 2012. Announcements included the re-election of Steve Chapman, president of the Gwinnett Gladiators, to his seventh term as board president, capping of league membership at 26 teams, adoption of a two-referee system for the conference finals and Kelly Cup finals, and the league re-alignment for the 2012–13 season. The San Francisco Bulls joined the Western Conference's Pacific Division, while in the Eastern Conference, the Orlando Solar Bears joined the South Division and the Fort Wayne Komets and Evansville IceMen joined the North Division following the departure of the Chicago Express. The league also voted to table any decision regarding the playoff format until the Board of Governors' preseason meeting.

Preseason Board of Governors meeting
The preseason Board of Governors meeting was held on September 27, 2012. Announcements included changes to the Kelly Cup playoff format and a change to the league's reserve list policy. The 3-day and 7-day injured reserve spots were changed to two generic reserve spots with no minimum stay required. No change was made to the 21-day reserve list policy.

All-star game
The 2013 ECHL All-Star Game was played on January 23, 2013, and was hosted by the Colorado Eagles at Budweiser Events Center. The format featured the host team Eagles taking on the ECHL All-Star Team. The ECHL All-Stars won the game 7–3, scoring five unanswered goals in the second period to tie an ECHL All-Star Game record.

Regular season

Standings

By division 
Eastern Conference

Western Conference

By conference 

* - Division leader; y - Won division; z - Won conference (and division)

* - Division leader; y - Won division; b - Won Brabham Cup, best record in the league

2013 Kelly Cup playoffs

Format
The 2013 Kelly Cup playoffs format represented a significant departure from previous years. Eight teams qualified in the Eastern Conference: the three division winners plus the next five teams in the conference. With the addition of the expansion franchise in the San Francisco Bulls, the Board of Governors changed the Western Conference seeding such that eight teams qualified: two division winners and the next six teams in the conference. This eliminated the Western Conference first-round bye.

Similar to the NHL, the division winners were seeded as the top three seeds in the Eastern Conference and the top two seeds in the Western Conference; the conference winner faces the eighth seed, second faces seventh, third faces sixth, and fourth faces fifth in the conference quarterfinal round. The winner of the 1st/8th series plays the winner of the 4th/5th series while 2nd/7th winner plays against the 3rd/6th winner in the conference semifinal series.

The Board of Governors also elected to change the playoff format such that all rounds of the playoffs were best of seven series. For 2013, the conference finals and Kelly Cup finals used a two-referee system.

Bracket

Awards

All-ECHL First Team

Michael Forney (F), Colorado Eagles
Casey Pierro-Zabotel (F), Gwinnett Gladiators
Mathieu Roy (F), Florida Everblades 
Matt Case (D), Idaho Steelheads 
Sacha Guimond (D), Gwinnett Gladiators 
Ryan Zapolski (G), South Carolina Stingrays

References

See also
2012 in sports
2013 in sports

 
2012-13
3
3